Turpentine weed is a common name for several plants and may refer to:

Gutierrezia sarothrae
Silphium perfoliatum, native to eastern and central North America
Silphium terebinthinaceum
Trichostema lanceolatum, native to western North America
Trichostema laxum